Notun Kore Pabo Bole is the debut studio album by Bangladeshi-Indian singer-songwriter Sahana Bajpaie, which is a collection of Rabindra Sangeet. It was released on 6 March 2007 from Bengal Music Company, Dhaka, with compositions by Shayan Chowdhury Arnob.

Track listing 
All lyrics and music written by Bengali poet Rabindranath Tagore.

Personnel
 Shayan Chowdhury Arnob - composition

References

External links
 Albums of Sahana Bajpaie 
 Notun Kore Pabo Bole at iTunes
 Notun Kore Pabo Bole at Last.fm

2007 albums
Sahana Bajpaie albums
Bengali-language albums
Bengal Music Company albums